Dasymalla glutinosa is a flowering plant in the mint family Lamiaceae and is endemic to Western Australia. It is a spreading, sticky shrub with glabrous branches, egg-shaped, stalkless leaves and small, white or cream-coloured, tube-shaped flowers.

Description

There are five lobes on the end of the petal tube, the lower one broad egg-shaped to almost round and slightly larger than the other four lobes.

Taxonomy and naming
This species was first formally described in 1979 by Ahmad Abid Munir who gave it the name Pityrodia glutinosa and published the description in Journal of the Adelaide Botanic Garden. In 2011, Barry Conn Murray Henwood and Nicola Streiber resurrected the genus Dasymalla and transferred this species to it as Dasymalla glutinosa. The specific epithet (glutinosa) is a Latin word meaning "viscous" or "sticky".

Distribution
Dasymalla glutinosa occurs between the Murchison River and Shark Bay in the Carnarvon, Geraldton Sandplains and Yalgoo biogeographic regions growing in sand on sandplains and dunes and in woodland.

Conservation
Dasymalla glutinosa is classified as "Priority Three" by the Government of Western Australia Department of Parks and Wildlife meaning that it is poorly known and known from only a few locations but is not under imminent threat.

References 

glutinosa
Plants described in 1979
Flora of Western Australia